Jonathan Holland may refer to:

Jonathan Holland (footballer) (born 1978), footballer for Hamrun Spartans
Jonathan Holland (American football) (born 1985), American football wide receiver
Jonathan Holland (rugby union) (born 1991), Irish rugby union player

See also 
 John Holland (disambiguation)